"Love Me In a Special Way" is a single by DeBarge, released on November 20, 1983. It was the second and final single from their third studio album, In a Special Way on the Gordy label.

Overview
The song was written, composed, arranged and produced by lead singer, El DeBarge, who mixed his modal tenor vocals with his high falsetto notes. The song includes a melodica solo by Stevie Wonder, a fellow Motown recording artist.

The single reached number 45 on the Billboard Hot 100 and number 11 on the R&B singles chart and increased the group's fan base as the group emerged as superstars that year. The single would later be covered by IMx, Tamia, and Kim Burrell, and would be sampled by rapper AZ on a similarly titled single, which featured sampled recordings of El's chorus line from the song. The song was sampled in 1995 by the RZA on "Cold World," off the GZA's highly acclaimed, first solo album, "Liquid Swords". In 2002, Ashanti sampled it for her song, "Dreams", on her self-titled debut album.

Charts

Personnel
Lead vocals and piano/keyboards: El DeBarge
Background vocals by DeBarge
Instrumentation by assorted musicians
Guest instrumentation/harmonica solo: Stevie Wonder

References

2.GZA Cold World (GZA song) Liquid Swords lp

1984 singles
DeBarge songs
Songs written by El DeBarge
1983 songs
Gordy Records singles
Soul ballads